David Kenneth Ritz Van Ronk (June 30, 1936 – February 10, 2002) was an American folk singer. An important figure in the American folk music revival and New York City's Greenwich Village scene in the 1960s, he was nicknamed the "Mayor of MacDougal Street".

Van Ronk's work ranged from old English ballads to blues, gospel, rock, New Orleans jazz, and swing. He was also known for performing instrumental ragtime guitar music, especially his transcription of "St. Louis Tickle" and Scott Joplin's "Maple Leaf Rag". Van Ronk was a widely admired avuncular figure in "the Village", presiding over the coffeehouse folk culture and acting as a friend to many up-and-coming artists by inspiring, assisting, and promoting them. Folk performers he befriended include Jim and Jean, Bob Dylan, Tom Paxton, Patrick Sky, Phil Ochs, Ramblin' Jack Elliott, and Joni Mitchell. Dylan recorded Van Ronk's arrangement of the traditional song "House of the Rising Sun" on his first album, which the Animals turned into a chart-topping rock single in 1964, helping inaugurate the folk-rock movement.

Van Ronk received a Lifetime Achievement Award from the American Society of Composers, Authors and Publishers (ASCAP) in December 1997.

Life and career
Van Ronk was born in Brooklyn to a family that was "mostly Irish, despite the Dutch name". He moved from Brooklyn to Queens around 1945 and began attending Holy Child Jesus Catholic School, whose students were mainly of Irish descent. He had been performing in a barbershop quartet since 1949, but left before finishing high school, and spent time in the Merchant Marine.

His first professional gigs playing tenor banjola were with various traditional jazz bands around New York, of which he later observed: "We wanted to play traditional jazz in the worst way ... and we did!" But the trad jazz revival had already passed its prime, and Van Ronk turned to performing blues he had stumbled across while shopping for jazz 78s, by artists like the Reverend Gary Davis, Furry Lewis and Mississippi John Hurt.

By about 1958, he was firmly committed to the folk-blues style, accompanying himself with his own acoustic guitar. He performed blues, jazz and folk music, occasionally writing his own songs but generally arranging the work of earlier artists and his folk revival peers.

He became noted both for his large physical stature and his expansive charisma, which bespoke an intellectual, cultured gentleman of many talents. Among his many interests were cooking, science fiction (he was active for some time in science fiction fandom, referring to it as "mind rot", and contributed to fanzines), world history, and politics. During the 1960s he supported radical left-wing political causes and was a member of the Libertarian League and the Trotskyist American Committee for the Fourth International (ACFI, later renamed the Workers League). In 1974, he appeared at "An Evening For Salvador Allende", a concert organized by Phil Ochs, alongside such other performers as his old friend Bob Dylan, to protest the overthrow of the democratic socialist government of Chile and to aid refugees from the U.S.-backed military junta led by Augusto Pinochet. After Ochs's suicide in 1976, Van Ronk joined the many performers who played at his memorial concert in the Felt Forum at Madison Square Garden, playing his bluesy version of the traditional folk ballad "He Was A Friend Of Mine". Although Van Ronk was less politically active in later years, he remained committed to anarchist and socialist ideals and was a dues-paying member of the Industrial Workers of the World (IWW) almost until his death.

Van Ronk was among 13 people arrested at the Stonewall Inn June 28, 1969—the night of the Stonewall Riots, which is widely credited as the spark of the contemporary gay rights movement. Van Ronk had been dining at a neighboring restaurant, joined the riot against the Stonewall's police occupation, and was dragged from the crowd into the building by police deputy inspector Seymour Pine. The police slapped and punched Van Ronk to the point of near unconsciousness, handcuffed him to a radiator near the doorway, and decided to charge him for assault. Recalling the expanding riot, Van Ronk said, "There were more people out there [outside the building] when I came out than when I went in. Things were still flying through the air, cacophony—I mean, just screaming and yelling, sirens, strobe lights, the whole spaghetti." The next day, he was arrested and later released on his own recognizance for having thrown a heavy object at a police officer. City records show he was charged with felony assault in the second degree and pleaded guilty to the lesser charge of harassment, classified in 1969 as a violation under PL 240.25.

In 2000, he performed at Blind Willie's in Atlanta, speaking fondly of his impending return to Greenwich Village. He reminisced over tunes like "You've Been a Good Old Wagon", a song teasing a worn-out lover, which he ruefully remarked had seemed humorous to him back in 1962. He was married to Terri Thal in the 1960s, lived for many years with Joanne Grace, then married Andrea Vuocolo, with whom he spent the rest of his life. He continued to perform for four decades and gave his last concert just a few months before his death.

Van Ronk died before completing work on his memoirs, which were finished by his collaborator, Elijah Wald, and published in 2005 as The Mayor Of MacDougal Street.

In 2004, a section of Sheridan Square, where Barrow Street meets Washington Place, was renamed Dave Van Ronk Street in his memory. Van Ronk was awarded the Lifetime Achievement Award posthumously by the World Folk Music Association in 2004.

Death

On February 10, 2002, Dave Van Ronk died in a New York hospital of cardiopulmonary failure while undergoing postoperative treatment for colon cancer.

Cultural impact

Van Ronk was  an irreverent  guitar artist and interpreter of Black blues and folk, with an uncannily precise gift for impersonation. Joni Mitchell said that his rendition of her song "Both Sides Now" (which he called "Clouds") was her favorite version of the song.

His guitar work, for which he credits Tom Paley as fingerpicking teacher, is noteworthy for both syncopation and precision. It shows similarities to Mississippi John Hurt's, but Van Ronk's main influence was the Reverend Gary Davis, who conceived the guitar as "a piano around his neck." Van Ronk took this pianistic approach and added a harmonic sophistication adapted from the band voicings of Jelly Roll Morton and Duke Ellington. He ranks high in bringing blues style to Greenwich Village during the 1960s, as well as introducing the folk world to the complex harmonies of Kurt Weill in his many Brecht-Weill interpretations, and was one of a very few hardcore traditional revivalists to move with the times, bringing old blues and ballads together with the new sounds of Dylan, Mitchell and Leonard Cohen. During this crucial period, he performed with Dylan and similar artists and spent many years teaching guitar in Greenwich Village, including to Christine Lavin, David Massengill, Terre Roche and Suzzy Roche. He influenced his protégé Danny Kalb and the Blues Project. The Japanese singer Masato Tomobe, American pop-folk singer Geoff Thais and the musician and writer Elijah Wald learned from him as well. He once said, "Painting is all about space, and music is all about time." In his autobiography, Dylan writes, "I'd heard Van Ronk back in the Midwest on records and thought he was pretty great, copied some of his recordings phrase for phrase. [...] Van Ronk could howl and whisper, turn blues into ballads and ballads into blues. I loved his style. He was what the city was all about. In Greenwich Village, Van Ronk was king of the street, he reigned supreme."

Thanks to what he had learned from Davis, Van Ronk was among the first to adapt traditional jazz and ragtime to the solo acoustic guitar  with arrangements of such ragtime hits as "St. Louis Tickle", "The Entertainer", "The Pearls" and "Maple Leaf Rag".

The Coen brothers film Inside Llewyn Davis follows a folk singer similar to Van Ronk, and incorporates anecdotes based on Van Ronk's life.

Van Ronk is mentioned in David Bowie's 2013 song ‘(You Will) Set the World on Fire' on The Next Day album. Van Ronk was mentioned among the dead musicians and recording artists in the song "Mirror Door" by the Who in 2006 on the album Endless Wire.

Personal characteristics
Van Ronk refused for many years to fly and never learned to drive (he took trains or buses or, when possible, recruited a girlfriend or young musician as his driver), and he declined to ever move from Greenwich Village for any extended period of time (having stayed in California for a short time in the 1960s). Van Ronk's trademark stoneware jug of Tullamore Dew was frequently seen on stage next to him in his early days.

Critic Robert Shelton described Van Ronk as "the musical mayor of MacDougal Street":

...a tall, garrulous hairy man of three quarters, or, more accurately, three fifths Irish descent. Topped by light brownish hair and a leonine beard, which he smoothed down several times a minute, he resembled an unmade bed strewn with books, record jackets, pipes, empty whiskey bottles, lines from obscure poets, finger picks, and broken guitar strings. He was [Dylan]'s first New York guru. Van Ronk was a walking museum of the blues. Through an early interest in jazz, he had gravitated toward black music—its jazz pole, its jug-band and ragtime center, its blues bedrock.... His manner was rough and testy, disguising a warm, sensitive core.

Discography

Studio albums
 1959: Van Ronk Sings Ballads, Blues, and a Spiritual (also released as Gambler's Blues and Black Mountain Blues) (Folkways)
 1961: Dave Van Ronk Sings (also released as Dave Van Ronk Sings the Blues and Dave Van Ronk Sings Earthy Ballads and Blues) (Folkways)
 1962: Dave Van Ronk, Folksinger (Prestige)
 1963: In the Tradition (Prestige)
 1964: Inside Dave Van Ronk (Prestige)
 1964: Dave Van Ronk and the Ragtime Jug Stompers (Mercury)
 1964: Just Dave Van Ronk (Mercury)
 1966: No Dirty Names (Verve/Forecast)
 1967: Dave Van Ronk and the Hudson Dusters (Verve Forecast)
 1971: Van Ronk (Polydor)
 1973: Songs for Ageing Children (Cadet)
 1976: Sunday Street (Philo)
 1980: Somebody Else, Not Me (Philo)
 1982: Your Basic Dave Van Ronk
 1985: Going Back to Brooklyn (Reckless)
 1990: Hummin' to Myself
 1990: Peter and the Wolf
 1992: Let No One Deceive You: Songs of Bertolt Brecht (Frankie Armstrong & Dave Van Ronk)
 1994: To All My Friends in Far-Flung Places
 1995: From... Another Time & Place
 2001: Sweet & Lowdown
 2005: The Mayor of MacDougal Street
 2013: Down in Washington Square: The Smithsonian Folkways Collection (Smithsonian Folkways)

Live
 1982: Your Basic Dave Van Ronk
 1983: St James Infirmary (released in 1996 as Statesboro Blues)
 1983: Dave Van Ronk in Rome
 1997: Live at Sir George Williams University (recorded in 1967)
 2004: Dave Van Ronk: ...and the tin pan bended and the story ended... (Smithsonian Folkways)
 2008: On Air (1993)
 2014: Live in Monterey (recorded in 1998)
 2015: Hear Me Howl: Live 1964 (recorded Indiana University, Bloomington Indiana, October 20, 1964)

Compilation albums

 1972: Van Ronk (includes Folksinger and Inside Dave Van Ronk in their entirety. Later released on CD as Inside Dave Van Ronk LP reissued in 2013)
 1988: Hesitation Blues
 1989: Inside Dave Van Ronk
 1991: The Folkways Years, 1959 - 1961 (Smithsonian Folkways)
 1992: A Chrestomathy
 2002: Two Sides of Dave Van Ronk (includes all of In the Tradition and most of Your Basic Dave Van Ronk)
 2012: Bluesmaster (includes all of Sings Ballads, Blues and a Spiritual and selections from Dave Van Ronk Sings)

As guest
 1958: Skiffle in Stereo (The Orange Blossom Jug Five)
 1959: The Unfortunate Rake
 1959: Fo'csle Songs and Shanties (by Paul Clayton) - Van Ronk sings on all songs.
 1963: Newport Folk Festival 1963 The Evening Concerts Vol. 2
 1964: Blues from Newport
 1964: The Blues Project
 1995: Life Lines, Peter, Paul and Mary,
 1998: Other Voices, Too, Nanci Griffith
 1999: The Man From God Knows Where, Tom Russell

Tributes

 2007: Dave on Dave, David Massengill album tribute to Dave Van Ronk
 2015: Redemption Road, Tom Paxton album including the tribute song, The Mayor of MacDougal Street about Dave Van Ronk

Bibliography
Van Ronk was author of a posthumous memoir, The Mayor of MacDougal Street (2005) written with Elijah Wald.  Anecdotes from the book were used as a source for the film Inside Llewyn Davis.

Van Ronk and Richard Ellington collected and edited The Bosses' Songbook: [32] Songs to Stifle the Flames of Discontent, Second Edition – A Collection of Modern Political Songs and Satire (Richard Ellington, publisher: New York, 1959).

References

External links
 NY Times obituary
 Dave Van Ronk – The Mayor of MacDougal Street, About the book. ElijahWald.com.
 
 Stefan Wirz. Illustrated Dave Van Ronk discography
 Otto Bost (June 30, 2004). Dave Van Ronk Street Renaming Ceremony Photo essay. OttoFocus.net
 Charles Freudenthal (August 2005). Walking Down Dave Van Ronk Street.  Anecdotes. e*I*21.  (Vol. 4 No. 4)
 Dave Van Ronk Discography.  Smithsonian Folkways.
 Dave Read (December 2, 2013). Remembering Dave Van Ronk article about meetings with Dave Van Ronk in the 1970s and 1999. 
 David Browne (December 2, 2013). Rolling Stone. Meet the folk singer who inspired 'Inside Llewyn Davis'.
 Aaron J. Leonard (July 8, 2018) Newly Unearthed FBI File Exposes Targeting of Folk Singer Dave Van Ronk

1936 births
2002 deaths
20th-century American male singers
20th-century American singers
American blues singers
American folk guitarists
American male guitarists
American folk singers
American jazz singers
American sailors
American Trotskyists
American people of Irish descent
Deaths from cancer in New York (state)
Deaths from colorectal cancer
Fingerstyle guitarists
Industrial Workers of the World members
Musicians from Brooklyn
People from Greenwich Village
Fast Folk artists
Guitarists from New York (state)
20th-century American guitarists
Jazz musicians from New York (state)
American male jazz musicians